Pleocoma rubiginosa is a species of rain beetle in the family Pleocomidae. It is found in North America.

Subspecies
These two subspecies belong to the species Pleocoma rubiginosa:
 Pleocoma rubiginosa rubiginosa Hovore, 1972
 Pleocoma rubiginosa transsierrae Hovore, 1972

References

Further reading

 

scarabaeiformia
Articles created by Qbugbot
Beetles described in 1972